Sogetel is a private Canadian telecommunications company founded in 1892.

Sogetel is a landline independent telephone company that serves multiple areas, most rural, in Quebec. 

Sogetel Numérique (9164-3122 Québec Inc.) operates as a competitive local exchange carrier in various communities in Bell territory (Bell Aliant, Bell Canada and Télébec)

Services offered
 Local telephony
 
 Cellular phone
 Internet service provider
 Web hosting

Served areas
 Centre-du-Québec
 Chaudière-Appalaches
 Mauricie
 Montérégie

Subsidiaries
 Sogetel Mobilité
 Sogetel Interurbain (merged into Sogetel in 2009)
 Sogetel Numérique (merged into Sogetel in 2009)
 Sogetel Internet NTIC (merged into Sogetel Numérique in 2007)
 Téléphone Milot
 Corporation de Téléphone de La Baie (merged into Téléphone Milot in 2007)
 Compagnie téléphone Nantes inc. (merged into Téléphone Milot in 2008)Vi

References

Other
Sogetel is member of :
 Independent Telecommunications Providers Association (ITPA)
 Canadian Independent Telephone Association (CITA)

Telecommunications companies established in 1892
Telecommunications companies of Canada
1892 establishments in Quebec
Companies based in Quebec
Nicolet, Quebec